Kessleria nivescens is a moth of the family Yponomeutidae. It is found in Italy, Slovenia and Austria.

The length of the forewings is 8-9.6 mm for males and 6.9–8 mm for females. The forewings are white with light brown to grey sprinkling. The hindwings are light grey. Adults are on wing from mid July to the beginning of September.

The larvae feed on Saxifraga caesia and Saxifraga tombeaensis. They have a dark greenish brown body and black head.

References

Moths described in 1980
Yponomeutidae
Moths of Europe